James Mackenzie (born 15 May 1979) is a Scottish actor and game show host, best known for playing the original lead role in the children's game show Raven. His titular character's catchphrase on the show was "Let the challenge... Begin." He has also played Gary Trenton in the BBC Scotland soap opera River City. Since 2018, Mackenzie has played a widower father in the CBeebies show Molly and Mack.

Personal life
Mackenzie was born in Dundee and has lived in Scotland all his life. He was educated at Queen Margaret University College, where he studied acting. He is the son of actor Michael Mackenzie, who in the 1970s played the title role of Tarot in Ace of Wands, a cult children's TV series of the time; Mackenzie Sr. also made several appearances in Raven: The Island as Cyrus, as well as in River City, with Mackenzie playing the character Alasdair Quinn.

Career
His television career has mainly focused on the Raven series, but he has also appeared in several other television programmes, such as Rebus, Taggart, CBBC series Dani's House and Scotland soap opera River City. His stage career over the years has spanned everything from Macbeth to pantomime. His voice can also be heard on many commercial voiceovers. Mackenzie toured the UK with Dundee Rep's production of Sunshine on Leith, a musical based on the songs of the Proclaimers, starring alongside The Lord of the Rings''' Billy Boyd.

As well as his acting work, he has also presented for CBBC on a couple of occasions, and appeared as a special guest presenter on the CBBC art show, SMart. He currently has a part on Molly and Mack as a widower father, and played a convict called Caleb in season 4 of Outlander''.

Filmography

References

External links
James Mackenzie's official website

1979 births
Living people
Scottish male television actors
Alumni of Queen Margaret University
Male actors from Dundee